Mataniko is a suburb of Honiara, Solomon Islands. During WWII village Matanikau, place of fights between US and Japan military during Guadalcanal campaign.

References

Populated places in Guadalcanal Province
Suburbs of Honiara